Manaus Aerotáxi is a passenger airline in Brazil; it operates air taxi services across jungle cities and South America. Its main office is located at Eduardo Gomes International Airport in Manaus.

Manaus Aerotáxi is a sister company of MAP Linhas Aéreas.

Accidents and incidents

On February 7, 2009 an Embraer Bandeirante air taxi chartered by Manaus Aerotáxi crashed.

References

External links
 Manaus Aerotáxi 

Airlines of Brazil
Manaus